The following is a list of Malayalam films released in 1965.

1965
Malayalam
 Mal
 1965
1965 in Indian cinema